Melody for Three is a 1941 American film directed by Erle C. Kenton, one of the six films of the Dr. Christian series.

Plot summary 

Dr. Christian takes an interest in a young boy, a violin prodigy, whose mother is a divorced music teacher. His interest isn't just in the boy's music career—he believes it would be best for the boy to have his parents back together, and sets out to do just that.

Cast 
Jean Hersholt as Dr. Paul Christian
Fay Wray as Mary Stanley
Walter Woolf King as Antoine Pirelle
Astrid Allwyn as Gladys McClelland
Schuyler Standish as Billy Stanley
Maude Eburne as Mrs. Hastings
Andrew Tombes as Mickey Delany
Hank Mann as Man at musical (uncredited)
Elvia Allman As Radio Station Receptionist (uncredited)
Toscha Seidel as Violinist

References

External links 

1941 films
American black-and-white films
Films directed by Erle C. Kenton
1941 drama films
American drama films
1940s English-language films
1940s American films
Dr. Christian films